Denise van Outen (born Denise Kathleen Outen; 27 May 1974) is an English actress, singer, dancer and presenter. She presented The Big Breakfast, played Roxie Hart in the musical Chicago both in the West End and on Broadway and finished as runner-up in the tenth series of the BBC One dancing show Strictly Come Dancing.

She was a judge on Any Dream Will Do in 2007, Born to Shine in 2011, and Ireland's Got Talent which ran for two seasons (2018–2019). Van Outen also narrates the ITVBe reality television series The Only Way Is Essex.

Early life
Born Denise Kathleen Outen in Basildon, Essex, England, she has a brother Terry and sister Jackie. She claims that her ancestors "are all Dutch", which was the reason she added "van" into her name. At the age of seven, she began modelling for knitting patterns, and showed an early flair for performing. This resulted in her attending the Sylvia Young Theatre School. In 1986, she played Éponine in Les Misérables (the role paid her school fees), the Anthony Newley-directed production of Stop the World - I Want to Get Off, and A Midsummer Night's Dream with the Royal Shakespeare Company.

Career

Early career
As a teenager she had brief roles on a number of television dramas including Kappatoo and The Bill.  In 1992, she appeared in a Drinking and Driving Wrecks Lives commercial. She also performed backing vocals with Melanie Blatt for the group Dreadzone. In the mid 1990s, she sang with former video game soundtrack singer Cathy Warwick in a 'girl group' called Those2Girls, by which time she had become Denise van Outen. Those2Girls were signed to BMG's Final Vinyl record label and had a minor Top 40 hit in 1995, called "All I Want". Van Outen was voted Rear of the Year in 1999, and was top of a poll to find the most desired "bikini body" in a 2007 poll of readers of Grazia magazine.

Acting
During her first stint on The Big Breakfast show, she appeared as Jill in ITV1's version of the pantomime Jack and the Beanstalk alongside Julie Walters and Neil Morrissey. Wanting to further develop her acting career, she left The Big Breakfast at the end of 1998. In 1999, she appeared on several episodes of The Bill and The Young Person's Guide To Becoming A Rock Star, the BBC's Murder in Mind short series of crime dramas, and on 2 series of Babes in the Wood with Karl Howman and Samantha Janus.

Van Outen has also appeared in film, initially as Maureen in the crime comedy Love, Honour and Obey. In the anthology film Tube Tales, set on the London Underground, she played the lead character of Alex in the "Horny" segment, directed by Stephen Hopkins. Van Outen has played a small role in the romantic comedy Are You Ready For Love?

She first played Roxie Hart on the stage in the hit musical Chicago at the Adelphi Theatre in the West End in April 2001. Her run proved a hit with theatre-goers, selling out for the entire 20 weeks. Unknown in the United States, she reprised her role on Broadway in the spring of 2002, before returning to the show's London version in late April 2002. Late the same year, Van Outen appeared as one of many special guest stars in a performance of The Play What I Wrote once again in London's West End.

In 2003, she returned to the London stage at the Gielgud Theatre in Andrew Lloyd Webber's one-woman show Tell Me on a Sunday, which he reworked for her. She was a huge success and the show ran for nearly a year. She then joined the cast of the established ITV sentimental drama Where the Heart Is as one of the lead characters, playing single mother Kim Blakeney, continuing for two series.

Van Outen played Maureen in the 2007 London revival of Rent Remixed directed by William Baker until 22 December. She was forced to cancel some performances owing to a throat infection. In July 2009, van Outen played Mary in Hotel Babylon for the BBC. Her character was at the hotel for a science convention. In August 2009, van Outen made her Edinburgh Festival Fringe debut in Blondes, a show by Jackie Clune.

Van Outen took over the role of Paulette Bonafonté from Jill Halfpenny in the West End production of Legally Blonde on 25 October 2010. She continued in the role for 6 months. In 2012, Van Outen was cast in the film of the Ray Cooney farce Run for Your Wife alongside Danny Dyer, Sarah Harding and Neil Morrissey. In 2013, she co-wrote the one-woman musical play Some Girl I Used To Know with Terry Ronald, which she will tour in from January 2014.

In February 2015, it was announced that Van Outen would be joining the cast of EastEnders. Van Outen plays intelligent businesswoman Karin Smart who gets involved with Max Branning (Jake Wood), and has business history with Phil Mitchell (Steve McFadden). In August 2015, Van Outen performed the title role in a concert performance of the musical Sweet Charity at Cadogan Hall, with actor/singer Michael Xavier, ex-Girls Aloud band member Kimberley Walsh and West End star Kerry Ellis.

In September 2018, it was announced that she would be joining the cast of the 2018 London revival of Chicago at the Phoenix Theatre in the West End as Velma Kelly. Due to start rehearsals on 10 September 2018, in preparation for her first performance on 24 September, it was discovered that Van Outen had suffered a stress fracture in her heel, postponing her return to the production with her new dates yet to be announced.

Van Outen joined the cast of Australian soap opera Neighbours as Prudence Wallace in June 2019. She filmed her first scenes alongside cast members Stefan Dennis and Rebekah Elmaloglou in London, before flying out to join the cast at the serial's Melbourne studios. Her first scenes aired in September 2019.

Television appearances
In 2007, Van Outen co-presented Who Dares, Sings! with Ben Shephard and in 2008 she fronted Sky1's Hairspray: The School Musical. She currently narrates the ITVBe series The Only Way Is Essex.

Van Outen guest presented This Morning in 2005, The Friday Night Project in 2006, The 5 O'Clock Show in 2010, Lorraine in 2010 and 2012 and Sunday Brunch in 2013. She was a judge on the 2011 series Born to Shine. She was a guest panellist on an episode of Loose Women in 2014 and became a regular panellist on the show in September 2017.

Van Outen has been the presenter of Matalan Presents: The Show since 2016. On 30 August 2017, she was announced as one of the four judges on the first season of Ireland's Got Talent in 2018. In 2020, she competed in the ITV singing competition The Masked Singer as 'Fox', where she placed fifth.

Radio
On 4 February 2008, van Outen reunited with her former Big Breakfast partner Johnny Vaughan as co-host of Capital Breakfast on Capital Radio. On 29 July 2008, she quit the show, halfway through her contract, because of TV commitments and the early mornings. However, in April 2011 van Outen said that she left the show because relations between her and Vaughan had soured. She claims Vaughan has not spoken to her since. In spring 2013, van Outen started presenting her own Saturday afternoon radio show on London's Magic 105.4, airing between 1:00 pm and 3:00 pm.

Strictly Come Dancing
In September 2012, van Outen was announced as one of the celebrities competing on the tenth series of Strictly Come Dancing. She partnered with professional dancer James Jordan. The couple secured top of the leaderboard seven times. However, controversy arose when viewers criticised her participation in the competition because of the advantage of having had previous stage experience. On 20 December 2012, van Outen and Jordan finished as the runners-up alongside Kimberley Walsh & Pasha Kovalev, behind winning couple Louis Smith and Flavia Cacace.

Dancing on Ice
On 23 September 2020, van Outen was announced as one of the celebrities competing on the thirteenth series of Dancing on Ice. She was partnered with Matt Evers. On 16 January 2021, van Outen suffered a partially dislocated shoulder and tendon damage to her left shoulder after falling during rehearsals for the launch show of series 13 of Dancing On Ice; van Outen was able to perform a modified dance routine with her professional skate partner Matt Evers on the launch show. On 26 January 2021, van Outen withdrew from the competition as a result of her dislocation, as well as three bone fractures which were confirmed after further MRI scans.

Other work
Van Outen has designed two collections thus far for the website Very, part of the Shop Direct Group. The first collection was a maternity range launched in March 2010 and the second an autumn/winter collection.

In 1998 and 1999 she also co hosted the Childline concert in Dublin 

In 2021, she returned to music and released a cover of the Les Misérables musical song "On My Own" as a charity single in aid of the Make A Difference Trust. In February 2021, she launched her first podcast alongside partner Eddie Boxshall. Before We Say I Do follows the couple as they investigate types of relationship counselling in an attempt to iron out any differences they may have before they get married. It is produced by Yahoo! UK.

Personal life
From 1998 to 2001, she dated Jamiroquai lead singer Jay Kay. The couple were engaged, but split up in 2001. The Jamiroquai album A Funk Odyssey is mostly about their break-up.

From 2009 to 2015 (separated 2013); she was married to Any Dream Will Do winner Lee Mead. They have a daughter together, Betsy, who was born in 2010. From July 2014 she was in a relationship with commodities trader Eddie Boxshall; they lived together in Chelmsford. The relationship ended in January 2022.

Van Outen has worked with charity. She actively supports Breast Cancer Care and Great Ormond Street Hospital. In 2009, Van Outen climbed Mount Kilimanjaro for Comic Relief, and in 2013 took part in a trek across the Great Wall of China for the Royal Marsden Hospital.

Filmography

Film

Television

Stage credits

Discography

Albums

Singles

Bibliography
 A Bit of Me: From Basildon to Broadway, and back (Ebury Spotlight Books, 2022)

See also
 List of Strictly Come Dancing contestants

References

External links

1974 births
Living people
20th-century English actresses
21st-century English actresses
Alumni of the Sylvia Young Theatre School
Capital (radio network)
English female models
English film actresses
English musical theatre actresses
English people of Dutch descent
English pop singers
English stage actresses
English television actresses
English television presenters
People from Basildon
People from Corringham, Essex
Television personalities from Essex